Mohammad Barkatullah (1943/1944 - 3 August 2020) was a Bangladeshi television personality, director and producer. He served as the General Manager of Bangladesh Television and was notable for directing and producing popular BTV drama serials including Kothao Keu Nei, Shokal Shondha, Dhakay Thaki and Nokkhotrer Raat. He also served as the head of Channel One and Banglavision.

Personal life
Barkatullah was married to dance artiste Zeenat Barkatullah. Together they had two daughters, actor Bijori Barkatullah and Kajori Barkatullah.

He died on 3 August 2020, at Green Life Medical College and Hospital in Dhaka after contracting COVID-19 during the COVID-19 pandemic in Bangladesh.

Works
 Kothao Keu Nei
 Nokkhotrer Raat
 Shokal-Shondha
 Dhakay Thaki
 Chharpotro

References

1940s births
2020 deaths
Place of birth missing
Date of birth missing
Bangladeshi television producers
Deaths from the COVID-19 pandemic in Bangladesh
Burials at Mirpur Martyred Intellectual Graveyard